Ivan Šnirc (born 11 June 1993) is a Slovak football player who plays as a left back.

Club career

FC DAC 1904 Dunajská Streda
He made his professional debut for FK DAC 1904 Dunajská Streda against FC Spartak Trnava on 8 March 2014.

References

External links
 
 FC DAC 1904 Dunajská Streda profile
 Eurofotbal profile

1993 births
Living people
Slovak footballers
Association football defenders
FK Dukla Banská Bystrica players
FC DAC 1904 Dunajská Streda players
Slovak Super Liga players
Sportspeople from Banská Bystrica